Carbonyl cyanide-p-trifluoromethoxyphenylhydrazone (FCCP) is an ionophore that is a mobile ion carrier. It is referred to as an uncoupling agent because it disrupts ATP synthesis by transporting hydrogen ions through the mitochondrial membrane before they can be used to provide the energy for oxidative phosphorylation. It is a nitrile and hydrazone. FCCP was first described in 1962 by Heytler.

See also 
 Carbonyl cyanide m-chlorophenyl hydrazone (CCCP)

References

Ionophores
Nitriles
Trifluoromethyl ethers
Uncoupling agents
Hydrazones